Manuel Balbi (born March 13, 1978, Guadalajara, Jalisco, Mexico), is a Mexican actor, known for Seres: Genesis (2010), Casi treinta (2014) and Agua y aceite (2002).

Career 
He began his acting studies in the city of San Luis Potosi to 16 years at a stunt and as props in a theater workshop of the Mexican Social Security Institute (IMSS) in the state capital. In 1996, at age 18, he moved to Mexico City, after being accepted into the acting school of the telecommunications company Televisa's Center for Artistic Education (CEA). For three years, studying, and professional manner, taking acting classes in theater, television, film and text analysis, theater history, psychology, dance styles, jazz, classical, body language, vocalization and voice of the body.

Television roles

Awards and nominations

See also
 Mexican people of Italian descent

References

External links 
 

1978 births
Mexican male film actors
Mexican telenovela actors
Male actors from Guadalajara, Jalisco
Mexican people of Italian descent
21st-century Mexican male actors
Living people
Mexican male television actors